Košarkaški klub Čačak '94, commonly referred to as KK Čačak 94 or Čačak 94 Quantox due to sponsorship reasons, is a men's professional basketball club based in Čačak, Serbia. The club currently participates in the Basketball League of Serbia.

History 

The initiative for founding of the Čačak94 basketball club was started by a group of basketball enthusiasts in 1994. Dragomir Grujović was chosen for the president. In the words of the founders themselves, there was the need for a third basketball club in Čačak because of a big number of boys who were training basketball and couldn’t find their place in senior teams of the two existing clubs in Čačak. The first coach of the team was Dobrilo Jojić and the assistant coach was Slobodan Jovanović. The next summer, the management of the club was made stronger by Mirko Drobnjak and the club managed to win its first higher competition rank – The II Serbian League Western Group. The team finished the 1999–2000 season on the 13th position and lost the status of a member of the II Serbian League.

In August 2000, great sports enthusiast and basketball lover Zoran Krivokapić gathered a group of fifteen-year-old boys who he played the League of the younger categories of the Region 6 for the next couple of years. During 2002, great efforts were made in order to reorganize the club so that it could play the senior level basketball. Dušan Nikolić was elected the club’s president and Zoran Krivokapić was the coach. In that way, all the conditions for the continuation of the competition were created. In 2002/2003 season, the team returns in the senior competition and already in 2003 it gets the cadet team as well. Since 2003 until this day, Čačak94 has played a great number of games in the Summer League and the II Serbian League.

During 2016, the club was taken over by a new management led by Milan Popović. In 2017–18 season, the club was promoted to the 4th-tier Second Regional League, Division West – Group One and won the league. In 2018–19 season, the club was promoted to the 3rd-tier First Regional League, finishing on the 8th place. In the next season, the club finished on a second place and it didn't manage to move to the higher rank of competition. 

In the 2020–21 2MLS season, the club was promoted to the 2nd-tier Second League of Serbia. In the next season, the club finished 2nd and achieved promotion to the top-tier Basketball League of Serbia for the 2022–23 BLS season.

Players

Current roster

Coaches 

  Dobrilo Jojić 
  Zoran Krivokapić
  Zoran Stefanović (2017–2022)
  Ivan Radovanović (2022)
  Vladimir Lučić (2022)
  Ivan Radovanović (2022–present)

Trophies and awards

Trophies
 First Regional League, West Division (3rd-tier)
 Winners (1): 2020–21

 Second Regional League, West Group One Division (4th-tier)
 Winners (1): 2017–18

See also 
 KK Borac Čačak
 KK Mladost Čačak
 KK Železničar Čačak

References

External links
 
 Profile at srbijasport.net 
 Profile at eurobasket.com

Čačak
Sport in Čačak
Čačak
Čačak